Oxyna obesa is a species of fruit fly in the family Tephritidae.

Distribution
Spain, Iran.

References

Tephritinae
Insects described in 1862
Diptera of Asia
Diptera of Europe